Queensport is a small community in the Canadian province of Nova Scotia, located in  The Municipality of the District of Guysborough in Guysborough County. A lighthouse is still functioning on an island off the Queensport shore.

References
Queensport on Destination Nova Scotia

Communities in Guysborough County, Nova Scotia
General Service Areas in Nova Scotia